The 1929 North Dakota Flickertails football team, also known as the Nodaks, was an American football team that represented the University of North Dakota in the North Central Conference (NCC) during the 1929 college football season. In its second year under head coach Charles A. West, the team compiled a 9–1 record (4–0 against NCC opponents), won the conference championship, and outscored opponents by a total of 194 to 40.

Schedule

References

North Dakota
North Dakota Fighting Hawks football seasons
North Central Conference football champion seasons
North Dakota Flickertails football